Michael Paragyios (alternate spellings: Michalis, Mihalis Paragios) (Greek: Μιχάλης Παραγιός; born August 25, 1982, in Glyfada, Athens, Greece) is a Greek former professional basketball player. At a height of 2.07m (6 ft 9 ½ in) tall, he played at the power forward and center positions.

Professional career
Paragyios began playing basketball with Aris Glyfada. During his pro career, he played with some of the following clubs: Ionikos Nikeas, Ilysiakos, Maroussi, and Panionios. He won the Greek All-Star Game Slam Dunk Contest in the year 2006. In 2014, he joined Ethnikos Piraeus.

References

External links
Euroleague.net Profile
Eurobasket.com Profile
Greek Basket League Profile

1982 births
Living people
Centers (basketball)
Greek men's basketball players
Ilysiakos B.C. players
Ionikos Nikaias B.C. players
Maroussi B.C. players
Panionios B.C. players
Power forwards (basketball)
Basketball players from Athens